Kechagiadikos is a circle dance done on the Island of Lemnos in Greece. The dance is done free hold and moves in a circle. Both men and women dance the dance to the song 'Βρε Κεχαγιά Περήφανε' "Vre Kehagia Perifane'. The word Kehagia (Κεχαγιάς) comes from the Turkish word Kahya, housekeeper.

See also
Kalamatianos

External links
YouTube Dance of Kehagias

Greek dances
Circle dances